Manuel Octavio Gómez (November 14, 1934 – January 2, 1988) was a prolific Cuban film director and writer. His 1971 film The Days of Water was entered into the 7th Moscow International Film Festival where it won the Prix FIPRESCI.

Filmography
 Historia de una batalla (1962) (Story of a Battle)
 Cuentos del Alhambra (1963)
 El encuentro (1964)
 La salación (1966)
 Tulipa (1967)
 La primera carga al machete (1969) (The First Charge of the Machete)
 Los días del agua (1971) (The Days of Water)
 Ustedes tienen la palabra (1973)
 La tierra y el cielo (1976) (The Earth and the Sky)
 Una mujer, un hombre, una ciudad... (1978) (Woman, Man, City)
 ¡Patakín! quiere decir ¡fábula! (1981)
 El señor presidente (1983) (Mr. President)
 Gallego (1988)

References

External links
 
 Artículo de Santiago Juan-Navarro sobre La primera carga al machete, de Manuel Octavio Gómez

Spanish-language film directors
Cuban film directors
1988 deaths
1934 births